Promoter or Promotor may refer to:

Art, entertainment, and media
 The Promoter (1952), also known as The Card
 The Promoter (2012 film)

Professions
 Promoter (entertainment), one who makes arrangements for events or markets them to attract an audience
 Promotor (Dutch, Belgian, or German academia), a full professor of a Dutch, Flanders, or German university who formally promotes a PhD candidate to doctor, and is (formally) the principal supervisor during the doctoral research.
 Corporate promoter, an entity who takes active steps in the formation, organization, or financing of a corporation
 Tour promoter, individuals or companies responsible for organizing a live concert tour or special event performance

Science
 Promoter (catalysis), an accelerator of a catalyst, though not a catalyst itself
 Promoter (genetics), a regulatory region of DNA usually located upstream of a gene, providing a control point for regulated gene transcription

Other uses
 Promoter (role variant), one of the sixteen personality types of the Keirsey Temperament Sorter
 Promoter, an office of the Catholic Church such as Promoter of the Laity, Promoter of Peace and Justice, or Promoter of the Faith (also known as the Devil's advocate)
 Promotor (typeface), a typeface supplied by Joh. Enschede

See also
Promotion (disambiguation)